Angelo Bonelli (born 30 July 1962) is an Italian politician. He is the spokesperson of Green Europe.

In 1990 he became councillor for the XIII district of the City of Rome and from 1993 to 1994 he was president of this district. He was also Regional Councillor and Regional Assessor for environment in Lazio. In the 2006 Italian general election he was elected to the Chamber of Deputies, while in the 2008 Italian general election he was nominated with The Left – The Rainbow, but the list did not exceed the threshold and he wasn't re-elected.

On 10 October 2009, in the XXX National Congress of the Greens, he was appointed President of the party, beating Loredana De Petris, who wanted the fusion of the Greens with SEL.

In the 2010 regional election in Lazio he was again elected in the Regional Council, while in the 2012 local election he was candidate for Mayor of Taranto (declared in 1991 by the Ministry of the Environment "High Environmental Risk Area), gaining 12,277 preferences and the 12% of the votes.
 
On 23–24 November 2013, in the XXXII National Congress of the Greens, he was appointed Co-spokesperson of the Greens along with Luana Zanella, but in 2015 he left the guide of the party.

In January 2016 Bonelli resigned also from the office of municipal councillor of Taranto, after the criticisms about his absences, due to personal reasons.

In the 2018 general election Bonelli was candidated for the Senate in the uninominal constituency "Pesaro-Fano-Senigallia", supported by the centre-left coalition, but he was defeated by the M5S candidate Donatella Agostinelli.

In August 2022, he became leader of the Greens and Left Alliance for the 2022 Italian general election.

References

Federation of the Greens politicians
21st-century Italian politicians
20th-century Italian politicians
1962 births
Living people
Politicians from Rome
Green Europe politicians
Deputies of Legislature XV of Italy
Deputies of Legislature XIX of Italy